Frieze Art Fair is an international contemporary art fair in London, New York, Los Angeles, and Seoul. Frieze London takes place every October in London's Regent's Park. In the US, the fair ran on New York's Randall's Island from 2012–19 and in 2021 was held in the Shed at Hudson Yards, with its inaugural Los Angeles edition taking place February 2019. Frieze Seoul started in 2022 at COEX.

The London edition normally has about 160 exhibitors in Frieze. It is held over four days in a 40,000 square meter tent. There is a simultaneous Frieze Masters event showing older work with about 130 exhibitors, and a temporary sculpture park. In 2021 stand rental was £524 per square meter.

Background
The fair was launched by Amanda Sharp and Matthew Slotover, the founders of Frieze magazine.

Although staged for the purpose of selling work, out of its 68,000 visitors it was suggested in 2006 that only 20% intend to buy. The fair also commissions artist projects and holds a program of talks.
The galleries who apply each year are selected by gallerists who participate at Frieze, according to specific criteria.

Frieze Art Fair released sales figures following the first three fairs. However, Sharp and Slotover came to regard such results to be misleading and inaccurate, as many sales are completed post-fair, and many galleries choose to keep their sales figures private. From 2006 the fair has not released sales figures.

In 2010, Matthew Slotover, co-founder of the fair, debated whether "art fairs are about money" with Louisa Buck, Matthew Collings, and Jasper Joffe for the motion and against the motion Norman Rosenthal, Richard Wentworth, Matthew Slotover. Joffe claims that his criticisms of Frieze Art Fair led to his work being banned from the fair in 2010.

In May 2011, Slotover and Sharp announced the launch of two new art fairs – Frieze New York, and Frieze Masters.

Since the mid-2000s, auction houses Christie's, Sotheby's and Phillips have expanded their mid-season contemporary sales that coincided with Frieze London.

Fairs

Frieze Art Fair 2003
Space hire was £180 per meter.
The fair's income was £990,000 from 5,500 square meters (2,250 rentable).
Sales were £20 million.
There were 124 galleries.
There were 27,700 visitors.
non-profit programme Frieze Projects initiated with Polly Staple as curator.

Frieze Art Fair 2004
The fair's income from galleries was £1.5 million from 8,000 square meters (4,000 rentable).
Sales were £26 million.
There were 150 galleries.
There were 42,000 visitors.
Public admission price was £12.
There were over 1,000 gallery applications for places.
Booths were 24–120 square meters.
The fair was sponsored by Deutsche Bank AG.
US galleries included Gagosian, Zach Feuer Gallery, Matthew Marks, and Barbara Gladstone.
British galleries included White Cube, Lisson Gallery, and Victoria Miro Gallery.
European galleries included Hauser & Wirth.
Galleries came from Beijing, Melbourne, Moscow and Auckland.

Frieze Art Fair 2005
There were 160 galleries.
38 exhibitors were American and 35 British.
Celebrities at the opening included Claudia Schiffer, David Bowie, and Alexander McQueen.
Tracey Emin launched her book Strangeland to coincide with the 2005 fair.

Frieze Art Fair 2006
October 12–15
There was a preview on 11 October 2006.
Mika Rottenberg won the Cartier Award 2006.

Frieze Art Fair 2007

October 11–14
There was a preview for guests including Tracey Emin, Jake and Dinos Chapman, as well as Sam Taylor-Wood.
Mario Garcia Torres Wins the Cartier Award 2007
Neville Wakefield becomes curator of Frieze Projects

Frieze Art Fair 2008
October 16–19
Ticket prices for public entry cost between £15 and £25.
The fair featured talks by speakers including Carsten Holler, Yoko Ono, and Cosey Fanni Tutti
The winner of the Cartier Award 2008 was Wilfredo Prieto.

Frieze Art Fair 2009
October 5–18
Over 1000 artists showcased, 60,000 visitors, 165 galleries from 30 countries
Curators: Daniel Baumann and Sarah McCrory; the Fair included work by Stephanie Syjuco, Monika Sosnowska, Per Oskar Leu, Ryan Gander, Kim Coleman and Jenny Hogarth
The sculpture park included work by Paul McCarthy and Vanessa Billy
The winner of the Cartier Award 2009 was Jordan Wolfson.

Frieze Art Fair 2010
October 14–17 
Frieze Projects was curated by Sarah McCrory with work by Annika Ström, Nick Relph, Shahryar Neshat, Jeffrey Vallance, Spartacus Chetwynd amongst others.
The sculpture park included work by Jeppe Hein, Slavs and Tatars, Franz West, Hans-Peter Feldmann
The winner of the Cartier Award 2010 was Simon Fujiwara.

Frieze Art Fair 2011

October 13–16
The P.V was on 12 October 2011
Frieze Projects is curated by Sarah McCrory with work by Bik Van Der Pol, Pierre Huyghe, Christian Jankowski, LuckyPDF, Laure Prouvost, and Cara Tolmie
The winner of the Emdash Award 2011 was Anahita Razmi.

Frieze Art Fair 2012
October 11–14 
Also the first year for the Frieze Masters and Frieze New York editions.
Featured 175 leading international contemporary galleries and over 1,000 artists
Frieze Projects is curated by Sarah McCrory with work by Thomas Bayrle, Aslı Çavuşoğlu, DIS, Grizedale Arts / Yangjiang Group, Joanna Rajkowska.
The winner of the Emdash Award 2012 was Cécile B. Evans.

Frieze Art Fair 2013
October 17–20
Featuring 152 galleries from 30 countries. 
70,000 people attended the fair.
Pilvi Takala received the Emdash Award 2013
Nicola Lees becomes Frieze Projects curator

Frieze Art Fair 2014
October 15–18
47,000 visitors
162 participating galleries from 25 countries
Mélanie Matranga won the inaugural Frieze Artist Award 2014

Frieze Art Fair 2015
October 14–17
164 galleries from 27 different countries participated.
55,000 was the number of visitors this year.
Rachel Rose won the Frieze Artist Award 2015

Frieze New York 2016
In 2016, David Horvitz hired a pickpocket to place sculptures in the pockets of attendees of the annual Frieze Art Fair.  This was part of “Frieze Projects” a program of 6 commissioned interactive activities at the fair.  Said Horvitz, “Imagine how much money is concentrated there, among collectors and galleries—and then there’s this person walking around who’s basically a trained thief,”

Frieze Art Fair 2017
October 5–8

Frieze Art Fair 2018
October 4–7
Camden Arts Centre Emerging Artist Prize at Frieze won by Wong Ping

Frieze Art Fair 2019
 Regents Park
 October 3–6
 160 exhibitors from 36 countries
 40,000 square meters

Frieze Los Angeles 2019 

 Inaugural Los Angeles Edition
 February 15–17
 Presented at Paramount Pictures Studios

Frieze New York 2020 

 Cancelled in light of global health concerns regarding COVID-19 (coronavirus)

Frieze Art Fair 2021
Regents Park 
October 13–17
159 exhibitors
 £524 per square meter, £241-£338 per square meter in Focus

Frieze Masters Art Fair 2021
Regents Park
October 13–17
132 exhibitors
 £631 per square meter

Frieze New York 2021
 The Shed Manhattan 
 May 5–9
 64 exhibitors
 Admission $55-$265

Frieze Seoul 2022 

 COEX World Trade Center
 September 2–5
 110 exhibitors

Frieze Sculpture Park
The Frieze Sculpture Park has been curated since 2012 by Clare Lilley of Yorkshire Sculpture Park, with historic pieces joining the contemporary collection.

Outset / Frieze Art Fair Fund to benefit the Tate Collection

Outset Contemporary Art Fund was founded by Candida Gertler and Yana Peel in 2003 as a philanthropic organization dedicated to supporting new art. The charitable foundation focuses on bringing private funding from its supporters and trustees to public museums, galleries, and art projects. In 2003, Outset established the world's first acquisitions fund connected to an art fair. This ongoing collaboration with Tate and Frieze proved to be a cornerstone in the foundation's program of institutional acquisitions.

See also
Frieze (magazine)
Art Basel
Art Cologne
The Armory Show (art fair)

Notes and references

External links

Interview with FRIEZE co-founder Amanda Sharp
From Frieze to triptych, Financial Times 2011
New Masters fair should end the classic art Frieze-out, Guardian 2011
Letter to Panelists presenting at Frieze NY ART FAIR

Festivals in London
Arts festivals in England
Contemporary art fairs